Oregon Community Credit Union, which was founded as Lane Federal Credit Union and then was called U-Lane-O Credit Union from 1981 to 2003, is a credit union based in Eugene, Oregon, United States, owned by more than 150,000 members.

History
It was established in 1956 by a group of employees working for the state government who "pooled their money together in a shoe box." It is now the third largest of 84 credit unions in Oregon, serving 28 counties.

In 2003, the credit union considered merging with Portland Teachers Credit Union (now OnPoint Community Credit Union), the largest credit union in the state. The two did not end up merging.

Finance and services

Assets

Services
The credit union has seven branches in Eugene, Oregon, two in neighboring Springfield, one in Salem, and one in Wilsonville.

The credit union offers investing, mortgages, home equity, auto loans and other loans, banking accounts, online banking, and debit and credit card services. It continued to hire workers in the aftermath of the Great Recession.

Awards
In 2009, readers of Eugene's main newspaper, The Register-Guard, awarded the credit union as the best in Lane County for "lots of branches and great friendly service." The credit union again won the award in 2010 and in 2011.

References

Credit unions based in Oregon
Companies based in Eugene, Oregon
1956 establishments in Oregon